Diboll Independent School District is a public school district based in Diboll, Texas (USA).

In addition to Diboll, the district also serves the city of Burke.

In 2009, the school district was rated "academically acceptable" by the Texas Education Agency.

Schools
In the 2012–2013 school year, the district had students in six schools. 
High schools
Diboll High School (Grades 9-12)
Middle schools
Diboll Junior High School (Grades 6-8)
Elementary schools
H.G. Temple Intermediate School (Grades 4-5)
H.G. Temple Elementary School (Grades K-3)
Diboll Primary School (Grades EE-PK)
Alternative schools
Stubblefield Learning Center (Grades 9-12)

References

External links

School districts in Angelina County, Texas